The Brizendine House is a historic home in downtown Austin, Texas, constructed circa 1870. The building is located on 11th Street and is today surrounded by an annex to the Travis County Courthouse and the Blackwell/Thurman Criminal Justice Center.

The house was added to the National Register of Historic Places in 1974.  It is located at 507 W 11th Street.

Texas Historical Commission Marker Text
This simple vernacular rough ashlar house represents the life style of the late 19th century working middle-class family in Austin, Texas. The exterior proportions of the structure reflect Victorian influence. Built of limestone about 1870 by John R. Brizendine (1829–1914), an Austin carpenter, machinist, and miller. Brizendine, a native of Kentucky, lived here until his death. Mrs. Elizabeth Gordon bought the home in 1928, and members of her family lived here until 1972. Recorded Texas Historic Landmark-1974

References

Houses in Austin, Texas
Houses on the National Register of Historic Places in Texas
National Register of Historic Places in Austin, Texas
Recorded Texas Historic Landmarks
City of Austin Historic Landmarks